Mouyassue virus is a novel, single-stranded, enveloped, negative-sense RNA orthohantavirus.

Natural reservoir 
The banana pipistrelle (Neoromicia nanus) found in the Côte d'Ivoire is the natural reservoir of Mouyassue virus. It shares a common lineage with the Magboi virus (MGBV) found in the hairy slit-faced bat (Nycteris hispida) in Sierra Leone

References 

Zoonoses
Hantaviridae